Jon Guridi Aldalur (born 28 February 1995) is a Spanish professional footballer who plays for Spanish club Deportivo Alavés as a central midfielder.

Club career

Real Sociedad
Born in Azpeitia, Gipuzkoa, Basque Country, Guridi was a Real Sociedad youth graduate. On 11 July 2014 he was promoted to the reserve team in Segunda División B, and made his senior debut on 13 September by starting in a 3–2 away loss against Sestao River.

Guridi scored his first professional goal on 10 October 2015, netting a last-minute equalizer in a 1–1 home draw against the same opponent. The following 10 February, he renewed his contract until 2018.

Guridi made his first team – and La Liga – debut on 18 March 2017, starting in a 1–0 away loss against local rivals Deportivo Alavés. Ahead of the 2017–18 season, he was definitely promoted to the main squad.

Guridi scored his first professional goal on 3 November 2019, netting his team's first in a 4–2 loss at Elche CF, and was a regular starter as Mirandés avoided relegation. Upon returning from loan, he was assigned to the main squad in the top tier, and scored his first goal in the category on 22 May 2022, netting his team's only in a 2–1 home loss against Atlético Madrid.

Loan to C.D. Mirandés
In January 2019 he was loaned to Club Deportivo Mirandés, achieving promotion from Spanish Second Division B to Spanish Second Division that same season. For the 2019-20 season he was again loaned to the Miranda de Ebro team.

Alavés
On 11 July 2022, free agent Guridi signed a four-year contract with Deportivo Alavés, recently relegated to the second division.

Career statistics

Club

References

External links
Real Sociedad official profile

1995 births
Living people
People from Azpeitia
Spanish footballers
Footballers from the Basque Country (autonomous community)
Association football midfielders
La Liga players
Segunda División players
Segunda División B players
Real Sociedad B footballers
Real Sociedad footballers
CD Mirandés footballers
Deportivo Alavés players